Edmundo Piaggio (3 October 1905 – 27 July 1975) was an Argentine football defender. He was played in Lanús and Boca Juniors.

References

External links

1905 births
1975 deaths
Argentine footballers
Argentina international footballers
Argentine people of Italian descent
1930 FIFA World Cup players
Association football defenders
Sportspeople from Lanús